Tie line may refer to:

 Tie line (telephony), a circuit between two telephone exchanges.
 Tie line (electrical grid), an electrical circuit connecting balancing authorities.
 Tie line, an isothermal line through a two-phase region on a phase diagram.